Conahan is a surname. Notable people with the surname include:

Daniel Conahan (born 1954), American murderer, rapist, and possible serial killer
Michael Conahan (born 1952), American J.D. and convicted racketeer
Walter Conahan (1927–2015), American politician

See also
Conaghan